Daybovo is a rural locality (a selo) in Turochaksky District, the Altai Republic, Russia. The population was 1 as of 2016. There is 1 street.

Geography 
Daybovo is located 25 km northwest of Turochak (the district's administrative centre) by road. Udalovka is the nearest rural locality.

References 

Rural localities in Turochaksky District